Tomales Bay is a long, narrow inlet of the Pacific Ocean in Marin County in northern California in the United States. The bay forms the eastern boundary of Point Reyes National Seashore. Tomales Bay is recognized for protection by the California Bays and Estuaries Policy. On its northern end, it opens out onto Bodega Bay, which shelters it from the direct current of the Pacific (especially the California Current). The bay is formed along a submerged portion of the San Andreas Fault.

Oyster farming is a major industry on the bay. The two largest producers are Hog Island Oyster Company and Tomales Bay Oyster Company, both of which retail oysters to the public and have picnic grounds on the east shore. Hillsides east of Tomales Bay are grazed by cows belonging to local dairies. There is also grazing land west of the bay, on farms and ranches leased from Point Reyes National Seashore.

The bay sees significant amounts of water sports including sailing, kayaking, fishing and motor boating. Watercraft may be launched on Tomales Bay from the public boat ramp at Nick's Cove, north of Marshall. The sand bar at the mouth of Tomales Bay is notoriously dangerous, with a long history of small-boat accidents.

The California Office of Environmental Health Hazard Assessment (OEHHA) has developed a safe eating advisory for fish caught here, based on levels of mercury or PCBs found in local species.

Towns bordering Tomales Bay include Inverness, Inverness Park, Point Reyes Station, and Marshall.  Additional hamlets include Nick's Cove, Spengers, Duck Cove, Shallow Beach, and Vilicichs. Dillon Beach lies just to the north of the mouth of the bay, and Tomales just to the east.

History
The area is the unceded territory of the Coast Miwok. Documented villages in the area included Echa-kolum (south of Marshall), Sakloki (opposite Tomales Point), Shotommo-wi (near the mouth of the Estero de San Antonio), and Utumia (near Tomales).

Francis Drake is thought to have landed in nearby Drakes Estero in 1579. Members of the Vizcaíno Expedition found the Bay in 1603, and thinking it a river, named it Rio Grande de San Sebastian.

Early 19th-century settlements constituted the southernmost Russian colony in North America and were spread over an area stretching from Point Arena to Tomales Bay.

The narrow gauge North Pacific Coast Railroad from Sausalito was constructed along the east side of the bay in 1874 and extended to the Russian River until it was dismantled in 1930.

Tomales Bay State Park was formed to preserve some of the bay shore; it opened to the public in 1952. Popular units of the park include Heart's Desire Beach and Millerton Point.

The Ramsar Convention, signed in 1971, listed Tomales Bay as a wetland of international importance.

The Giacomini Wetland Restoration Project, completed in 2008, returned to wetland several hundred acres at the south end of the bay that had been drained for grazing during the 1940s.

Marconi Conference Center
The Marconi Conference Center State Historical Park preserves a small hotel built by Guglielmo Marconi in 1913 to house personnel who staffed his transpacific radio station nearby.  The hotel and the associated operations building and employee cottages were built by the J.G. White Engineering Corp under contract to Marconi. RCA purchased the station from Marconi in 1920. The station was closed in 1939, though other nearby radio stations on the Point Reyes Peninsula still operate today. Synanon, a drug rehabilitation organization and cult, owned it from the early 1960s until 1980, when it was purchased by a private foundation and given to the state in 1984 to operate as a conference center.

Gallery

See also

Hog Island (Tomales Bay)
Drakes Bay — adjacent to the south 
Nova Albion
Pacific herring

References

External links

Tomales Bay SP
Marconi Conference Center SHP
Marconi Conference Center

Bays of California
Bays of Marin County, California
West Marin
Landforms of the San Francisco Bay Area
Places with bioluminescence
Ramsar sites in the United States